Straight Ahead is an album by saxophonist David "Fathead" Newman featuring performances recorded in 1960 for the Atlantic label.

Reception

The contemporaneous DownBeat reviewer, Leonard Feather, described the album as "A modest, honest, most agreeable set", and highlighted Kelly's contributions, which he described as "amounting at times to a virtual duet with Newman". AllMusic awarded the album 4 stars stating "There is nothing particularly innovative about this recording, but the level of expertise and musical maturity displayed here is truly astonishing. This is simply straight-ahead hard bop performed by some of the finest musicians in 1960s jazz".

Track listing
All compositions by David "Fathead" Newman except as indicated
 "Batista's Groove" - 7:25
 "Skylark" (Hoagy Carmichael, Johnny Mercer) - 4:39
 "Night of Nisan" - 7:59
 "Cousin Slim" - 7:07 
 "Summertime" (George Gershwin, Ira Gershwin, DuBose Heyward) - 6:34
 "Congo Chant" - 4:20

Personnel 
David "Fathead" Newman - tenor saxophone, alto saxophone, flute
Wynton Kelly - piano
Paul Chambers - bass
Charlie Persip - drums

References 

1961 albums
David "Fathead" Newman albums
Albums produced by Nesuhi Ertegun
Atlantic Records albums